Lethe  ocellata,   the  dismal mystic, is a species of Satyrinae butterfly found in the  Indomalayan realm [Sichuan, Tibet, Sikkim, Manipur and, as subspecies  L. o. mon Yoshino, 2008 Vietnam)

References

ocellata
Butterflies of Asia